Night School is a 2016 novel by Lee Child. This is the twenty-first book in the Jack Reacher series.  It is written in the third person.

Plot
In 1996, U.S. Army Major Jack Reacher is in Virginia to receive a medal for eliminating two militants in the Balkans when he receives orders from his superior officer and trusted friend, Leon Garber, to attend a special "inter-agency cooperation" school alongside Casey Watterman, an FBI agent, and John White, a CIA officer. Reacher quickly realizes that there is no school: the entire thing is an elaborate joint-agency operation overseen by Alfred Ratcliffe, the National Security Advisor, and his deputy, Dr. Marian Sinclair. Ratcliffe informs the three men that, through a CIA double agent, the government has learned that a sleeper cell in Hamburg controlled by a Middle Eastern terrorist group has cut a deal with an unidentified American for $100 million. The three men are ordered to identify the American and whatever he's selling, and are given full access to anything they need, including bringing in their own staffs. Reacher chooses  Frances Neagley, his former Sergeant.

Reacher and Neagley travel to Hamburg to begin their investigation, during which they get in a fight in a skinhead bar. Unbeknownst to Reacher, the men inform on him to their friends in the Neo-nazi movement. Reacher and Neagley are summoned back to America to follow up on a lead. The CIA believes that the merchandise on sale is a computer virus and the seller could be using an IT conference in Hamburg to cover his travel. However, the lead turns out to be a red herring.

Reacher and Neagley return to Hamburg and meets the local chief of detectives, Griezman, who helps him to several leads, a municipal worker who claims to have witnessed an exchange between an American and a man of Middle Eastern origin, murder of a prostitute and two black market dealers with ties to a local forger who provided the American with false documents.

The witness, Helmut Klopp, describes the American he purported to have seen to Reacher and Griezman, but also shares the information with Dremmler, a shoe seller and an influential Neo-nazi leader. In turn, Dremmler has Muller, Griezman's deputy chief, secretly shadow Reacher's investigation.

The terrorists, meanwhile, arrange for the courier who had originally met with the American to be murdered in Kyiv for their own protection, and send a new messenger, to complete the deal.

The team contacts the US Army and learn that the American is Horace Wiley, an artilleryman who has been AWOL from his post for several months. Despite Griezman's attempts to intercept her, the messenger meets with Wiley and confirms the deal before leaving Germany. Reacher, through an extensive search of Wiley's past as well as meeting with both his "uncle" Arnold Mason and an aging commander who served alongside Mason during the Korean War, determines that the items being sold are "Davy Crocketts", miniature nuclear bombs developed during the Cold War. A stash of ten bombs had accidentally been left behind by the US Army in a German supply depot, and Wiley had dedicated his entire service career to finding and selling them to purchase a ranch in Argentina. Wiley murders the forger in his apartment and rents a van to move the bombs, which both the team and Dremmler learn about.

After setting an explosion to distract the authorities and narrowly evading Reacher's team when they search his apartment, Wiley is stabbed to death by two of Dremmler's men, who steal the van and the codes required to detonate the bombs. The team arrives at the same time as the crew hired by the terrorists to transport the goods; Reacher kills the workers and captures the messenger. With Griezman's help, he figures out that the van is being kept at Dremmler's shoe warehouse and takes Neagley and two military cops, Hooper and Orozco, to retrieve it. He finds and kills Dremmler in his office to cover up the theft. The military covers up all the other evidence and the bombs are returned to the United States. Reacher and Neagley are both awarded a Commendation Medal for their service.

Reception

Night School was generally well-received by critics. The Washington Post called it, "the best of the Reacher novels I’ve read,"   while the Evening Standard called it "utterly gripping."

References

External links

2016 British novels
English novels
Jack Reacher books
Third-person narrative novels
Bantam Press books